Three Lakes Ridge is located on the border of Alberta and British Columbia on the Continental Divide. It was named by the Interprovincial Boundary Survey.

See also
 List of peaks on the Alberta–British Columbia border
 Mountains of Alberta
 Mountains of British Columbia

References

Three Lakes Ridge
Three Lakes Ridge
Canadian Rockies